Jonathan Meredith (about 1772 – August 7, 1805) was a United States Marine during the First Barbary War.

Biography
Born in Bucks County, Pennsylvania, Meredith enlisted in the Marine Corps June 6, 1803 and was promoted to Sergeant August 1, of the same year.

During an engagement in the harbor of Tripoli August 3, 1805, Sergeant Meredith saved the life of Lieutenant John Trippe of USS Vixen, who with a party of nine men had boarded a Tripolitan ship. Heavily outnumbered, the boarding party fought a fierce hand-to-hand combat, in which Trippe was severely wounded; Meredith protected him from what would have been the final blow. Four days later Meredith was killed in the explosion of Gunboat No. 3 during a similar attack against the Tripolitans.

Namesakes
See USS Meredith for ships that have been named in his honor.

See also

References

External links
  history.navy.mil: USS Meredith

United States Marines
People from Bucks County, Pennsylvania
American people of Welsh descent
1772 births
1805 deaths
American military personnel of the First Barbary War